George Delano Webster (November 25, 1945 – April 19, 2007) was an American football player. He played professionally as a linebacker in the American Football League (AFL) and National Football League with the Houston Oilers, Pittsburgh Steelers, and New England Patriots. Webster played college football at Michigan State University. He was inducted into the College Football Hall of Fame in 1987.

College career
Webster was a defensive back, he is listed as one of the top 100 players (No. 31) at his alma mater, Michigan State University (MSU), where he played from 1964 to 1966. At MSU, he played roverback, a position created by head coach Duffy Daugherty as a combination of safety and linebacker who could run with wide receivers but be strong enough to take on any running back. His Spartan teams compiled a 23–6–1 record, including the famous 10–10 tie against Notre Dame on November 19, 1966, and won a share of the national championship in 1965 (UPI & National Football Foundation) and 1966 (NFF tie with Notre Dame). Among the honors given to Webster were being named to the All-Big Ten Conference and All-American teams in 1965 and 1966, his number 90 was the second to be retired by the university, and he was elected to the College Football Hall of Fame in 1987. In 1999 Webster was named one of the starting safeties on Sports Illustrated'''s NCAA football all-century team. His contributions at Michigan State are highlighted in the documentary Through the Banks of the Red Cedar'', written and directed by MSU teammate Gene Washington's daughter, Maya Washington.

Professional career
After being selected by the American Football League's Houston Oilers as the fifth player overall in the first round of the 1967 draft, Webster's position was changed. In an exhibition game against the Cowboys, opposing quarterback Don Meredith completed a square-out to "Bullet" Bob Hayes, a former Olympic speedster. Hayes thought he had broken into the open, but was brought down from behind by Webster.

Webster started at left linebacker and made 15 tackles in his first AFL game. He made his first pro interception that year, helping the Oilers win the Eastern Division title. He was part of a defensive unit that held opponents under 200 points for the season. Webster averaged more than ten tackles a game, and was named the UPI AFL Rookie of the Year. He was named to the AFL All-Star Game three times (1967, 1968, and 1969). He is a member of the AFL All-Time Team.

Post-career disability and death
In 1989, Webster applied for benefits as totally and permanently disabled. He was found to have lost most use of a hand, foot, knee and ankle due to football-related injuries but did not meet the NFL's definition of totally disabled. In 1998, the Supreme Court let stand a finding by the NFL's retirement board that Webster's disability was not related to his football career. Football-related disability benefits are $4,000 a month; non-football disability monthly benefits are $750.

In 2002, Webster had his right leg amputated above the knee in Houston because the limb had little circulation despite five previous surgeries. On April 19, 2007, Webster died in Houston.

See also
 List of American Football League players

References

External links
 
 

1945 births
2007 deaths
American amputees
American football linebackers
American Football League players
Houston Oilers players
Michigan State Spartans football players
New England Patriots players
Pittsburgh Steelers players
All-American college football players
American Football League All-Star players
American Football League All-Time Team
American Football League Rookies of the Year
College Football Hall of Fame inductees
People from Anderson, South Carolina
Players of American football from South Carolina
African-American players of American football
20th-century African-American sportspeople